On 23 February 2008, Spirit of Kansas, a B-2 Spirit stealth bomber of the United States Air Force, crashed on the runway moments after takeoff from Andersen Air Force Base in Guam. The aircraft was destroyed, but both crew members successfully ejected. The accident marked the first operational loss of a B‑2 bomber, and  remains the only one. With an estimated loss of US$1.4 billion, considering only the cost of the aircraft, it was also the most expensive aircraft crash in history.

Crash 

On 23 February 2008, a B‑2 crashed on the runway shortly after takeoff from Andersen Air Force Base in Guam. The crash of the Spirit of Kansas, 89-0127, which had been operated by the 393rd Bomb Squadron, 509th Bomb Wing, Whiteman Air Force Base, Missouri, and which had logged 5,100 flight hours, was the first ever crash of a B‑2.

The two-officer crew (Major Ryan Link and Captain Justin Grieve) attempted to control the bomber but were unable to do so, and as one of its wingtips made contact with the ground, they ejected and survived the crash. The aircraft was destroyed, a total loss estimated at US$1.4 billion.

According to the Air Force Times, a private-industry magazine, no munitions were on board. The Air Combat Command accident board report states that "classified material" had been loaded onto the bomber the morning the aircraft was returning to Whiteman Air Force Base "after a four-month deployment in support of Pacific Air Forces' continuous bomber presence."

At Guam Naval Hospital, one pilot was evaluated and released, and the second was hospitalized. A B‑2 already in the air was called back to Andersen following the crash, where it and the other B‑2s were grounded until an initial investigation into the crash was complete. Six Boeing B‑52s of the 96th Bomb Squadron, 2nd Bomb Wing at Barksdale Air Force Base, Louisiana, were deployed to replace the B‑2s.

The commander of the 509th Bomb Wing, Brig. Gen. Garrett Harencak, followed up on the incident by temporarily suspending flying operations for all 20 remaining B‑2s to review procedures. Harencak termed the suspension a "safety pause" and stated that the B‑2s would resume flying if called upon for immediate operations. The B‑2 fleet returned to flight status on 15 April 2008.

Investigation 
The findings of the investigation stated that the B‑2 crashed after "heavy, lashing rains" caused moisture to enter skin-flush air-data sensors. The data from the sensors are used to calculate numerous factors including airspeed and altitude. Because three pressure transducers failed to function—attributable to condensation inside devices, not a maintenance error—the flight-control computers calculated inaccurate aircraft angle of attack and airspeed. Incorrect airspeed data on cockpit displays led to the aircraft rotating at  slower than indicated. After the wheels lifted from the runway, which caused the flight control system to switch to different control laws, the erroneously sensed negative angle of attack caused the computers to inject a sudden, uncommanded 30-degree pitch-up maneuver. The combination of slow lift-off speed and the extreme angle of attack, with attendant drag, resulted in an unrecoverable stall, yaw, and descent. Both crew members successfully ejected from the aircraft soon after the left wing tip started to gouge the ground alongside the runway. The aircraft hit the ground, tumbled, and burned after its fuel ignited.

In popular culture 
The crash of "Spirit of Kansas" was featured on season 22 of the Canadian documentary series Mayday, in the episode titled "Stealth Bomber Down".

References

External links 

Video of the crash with detailed, technical narration.

21st-century military history of the United States
Aviation accidents and incidents in the United States in 2008
Aviation accidents and incidents in Guam
Accidents and incidents involving United States Air Force aircraft
2008 in Guam
History of Guam
February 2008 events in the United States
Northrop Grumman aircraft